New Glasgow may refer to:

 HMCS New Glasgow, a River class frigate

Places
 New Glasgow, Nova Scotia, Canada
 New Glasgow, Prince Edward Island, Canada
 New Glasgow, Quebec, a former village that merged into Sainte-Sophie, Quebec in 2000
 New Glasgow, Virginia, renamed Clifford, Virginia